Austria is competing with 26 athletes at the 2016 Summer Paralympics in Rio de Janeiro, Brazil, from 7 September to 18 September 2016.

Medalists

The following Austrian competitors won medals at the games. In the by discipline sections below, medalists' names are bolded.

Support 
“Project Rio 2016” was created by the government to support Paralympic athletes seeking to qualify for the Rio Games. The former Austrian Minister of Sport Gerald Klug met with Paralympians Andreas Onea 
and Sabine Weber-Treiber as part of this program. The current Minister of Sports is Hans Peter Doskozil.

Disability classifications

Every participant at the Paralympics has their disability grouped into one of five disability categories; amputation, the condition may be congenital or sustained through injury or illness; cerebral palsy; wheelchair athletes, there is often overlap between this and other categories; visual impairment, including blindness; Les autres, any physical disability that does not fall strictly under one of the other categories, for example dwarfism or multiple sclerosis. Each Paralympic sport then has its own classifications, dependent upon the specific physical demands of competition. Events are given a code, made of numbers and letters, describing the type of event and classification of the athletes competing. Some sports, such as athletics, divide athletes by both the category and severity of their disabilities, other sports, for example swimming, group competitors from different categories together, the only separation being based on the severity of the disability.

Athletics

Men
Track & road events

Field events

Women
Field events

Paracanoe

Men

Cycling 

With one pathway for qualification being one highest ranked NPCs on the UCI Para-Cycling male and female Nations Ranking Lists on 31 December 2014, Austria qualified for the 2016 Summer Paralympics in Rio, assuming they continued to meet all other eligibility requirements.

Road 

Men

Track 

Pursuit

Equestrian 

The country qualified to participate in the team event at the Rio Games.

Rowing

Sailing

One pathway for qualifying for Rio involved having a boat have top seven finish at the 2015 Combined World Championships in a medal event where the country had nor already qualified through via the 2014 IFDS Sailing World Championships.  Austria qualified for the 2016 Games under this criteria in the 2.4m event with a ninth-place finish overall and the first country who had not qualified via the 2014 Championships.  The boat was crewed by Sven Reiger.

Swimming 

Swimmers Andreas Onea and Sabine Weber-Treiber were Paralympic swimmers who benefited from the Austrian government's “Project Rio 2016”.

Men

Women

Table tennis 

Men

Women

Wheelchair tennis 
Austria qualified two competitors in the men's single event, Nico Langmann and Martin Legner.

Men

See also
Austria at the 2016 Summer Olympics

References

Nations at the 2016 Summer Paralympics
2016
2016 in Austrian sport